Montgomery House may refer to:

in the United Kingdom
 Montgomery House (Seaforth, Liverpool)
 Montgomery House (Aldershot)

in Northern Ireland
 Montgomery House (Belfast, Northern Ireland)

in the United States
Montgomery-Janes-Whittaker House, Prattville, Alabama, listed on the National Register of Historic Places (NRHP) in Autaga County
Pogue Hotel, Lemon Cove, California, also known as Montgomery House, NRHP-listed in Tulare County
 Montgomery House (Los Angeles, California), a popular hotel and saloon in 1850s Los Angeles, owned by William C. Getman.
 Montgomery House (Wilmington, Delaware), NRHP-listed
John Rogerson Montgomery House, Glencoe, Illinois, NRHP-listed in Cook County
 Conklin-Montgomery House, Cambridge City, Indiana, listed on the NRHP in Indiana 
 Burnett-Montgomery House, Fairfield, Iowa, listed on the NRHP in Iowa
 Montgomery House (Clay Village, Kentucky), listed on the NRHP in Kentucky
Todd-Montgomery Houses, Danville, Kentucky, listed on the NRHP in Kentucky
 Montgomery House (Donansburg, Kentucky), listed on the NRHP in Kentucky
William Montgomery House (Elizabethtown, Kentucky), listed on the NRHP in Kentucky
Dr. Thomas Montgomery House, Stanford, Kentucky, listed on the NRHP in Kentucky
 Montgomery House (Madison, Mississippi), listed on the NRHP in Mississippi
I. T. Montgomery House, Mound Bayou, Mississippi, listed on the NRHP in Mississippi
 Montgomery House (Claysville, Pennsylvania), listed on the NRHP in Pennsylvania
General William Montgomery House, Danville, Pennsylvania, listed on the NRHP in Pennsylvania
William Montgomery House (Lancaster, Pennsylvania), listed on the NRHP in Pennsylvania
Nathaniel Montgomery House, Pawtucket, Rhode Island, listed on the NRHP in Rhode Island
Walter Scott Montgomery House, Spartanburg, South Carolina, listed on the NRHP in South Carolina
 Montgomery House (Montgomery, Vermont), listed on the NRHP in Vermont

See also
William Montgomery House (disambiguation)
Montgomery Court (disambiguation)